In the neuroanatomy of animals, an avian pallium is the dorsal telencephalon of a bird's brain. The subpallium is the ventral telencephalon.

The pallium of avian species tends to be relatively large, comprising ~75% of the telencephalic volume. Birds have a unique pallial structure known as the hyperpallium, once called the hyperstriatum.

A 2002 conference at Duke University (Avian Brain Nomenclature Consortium) established a standard nomenclature for describing the avian pallium as follows:

Pallium
Pyriform cortex
Olfactory bulb
Hippocampus
Corticoid area
Hyperpallium
Apicale
Intercalatum
Densocellulare
Mesopallium
Dorsale
Ventrale
Nidopallium 
Field L2
Entopallium
Basorostralis
Arcopallium
Amygdaloid complex
Posterior amygdala
Nucleus taeniae
Subpallium
Striatum
Lateral
Medial
Pallidum
Globus pallidus or dorsal pallidum
Ventral pallidum

Notable researchers
Stanley Cobb
Onur Güntürkün
Andrew Iwaniuk

See also
Bird intelligence
Animal intelligence

References

External links

Bird neuroanatomy